Festus Bulugu Limbu (born 19 April 1956) is a Tanzanian CCM politician and Member of Parliament for Magu Town constituency since 2010.

References

1956 births
Living people
Chama Cha Mapinduzi MPs
Tanzanian MPs 2010–2015
Bwiru Boys Secondary School alumni
Mazengo Secondary School alumni
University of Dar es Salaam alumni
Technical University of Berlin alumni